Khiro River is a river in Mymensingh District of north-central Bangladesh.

References

Rivers of Bangladesh
Rivers of Dhaka Division